Belgium competed at the 2002 Winter Olympics in Salt Lake City, United States.

Figure skating

Short track speed skating

Speed skating

References
Official Olympic Reports

Nations at the 2002 Winter Olympics
2002 Winter Olympics
Olympics